VS1 may refer to:
VS1, a V speed in aviation
VS1, a grade of Diamond clarity
OS/VS1, an operating system